Denis Fogarty (born 16 July 1983) is a former Irish rugby union player who played at hooker for Munster, Aurillac, Agen and Provence. He has also represented Ireland at schoolboy, U21 and 'A' level. He was educated at Rockwell College. In May 2016, Fogarty was forced to retire from rugby after suffering a recurrence of a shoulder injury.

Munster
Fogarty made his debut for Munster against The Borders in the Celtic League in November 2004. When Frankie Sheahan sustained an injury, Fogarty was called up onto the bench for Munster's 2006 Heineken Cup Final against Biarritz Olympique in May 2006. He was part of the Munster A team that won the 2011–12 British and Irish Cup. His last game for Munster was the away play-off semi-final against Ospreys on 11 May 2012, which Munster lost 45-10.

Aurillac
It was announced on 25 April 2012 that Fogarty would be joining French Pro D2 side Stade Aurillacois Cantal Auvergne, better known as Aurillac. Fogarty was named in the Pro D2 team of the season for 2012-13.

Agen
Fogarty will join French Pro D2 side SU Agen Lot-et-Garonne, better known as Agen, on a two-year contract at the start of the 2013–14 season.

Provence Rugby
Fogarty currently played for French Pro D2 side Provence Rugby.

Ireland
Fogarty first represented Ireland A in the 2008 Churchill Cup. He was part of the Ireland A team that won the 2009 Churchill Cup, defeating England Saxons 49-22 in the final. He also played for Ireland A against Tonga in November 2009.

Honours

Munster
Heineken Cup:
Winner (1): 2005–06
Celtic League:
Winner (2): 2008–09, 2010–11

Munster A
British and Irish Cup:
Winner (1): 2011–12

Ireland A
Churchill Cup:
Winner (1): 2009

References

External links
Munster Profile

1983 births
Living people
Irish rugby union players
Munster Rugby players
Cork Constitution players
Rugby union hookers
People educated at Rockwell College
Rugby union players from County Limerick
Ireland Wolfhounds international rugby union players